The Helpmann Award for Best Male Actor in a Supporting Role in a Musical is a musical award, presented by Live Performance Australia (LPA) at the annual Helpmann Awards since 2003. This is a list of winners and nominations for the Helpmann Award for Best Male Actor in a Supporting Role in a Musical.

Winners and nominees

Source:

2000s

2010s

See also
Helpmann Awards

Notes

A: In Shout! The Legend Of The Wild One, John Paul Young featured in guest cameos, playing parts such as the security guard and "tartan-trousered sideshow barker".

References

External links
The official Helpmann Awards website

M